, known by her stage name  is a Japanese actress and voice actress.

Career
Although she was active in her real name (then) at the time of "Kirakira ☆ Melody Gakuen" (first year student, number 63), after graduating she took the name Nao Hoshino. The stage name was given by Kaneta Kimotsuki, the head of 21st Century Fox.

In November 2002, she went on stage for the first time at the 21st Century Fox 51st Performance “Moonlight and Organ”. Since then, she has appeared on Fox's stage and has acted as a stage actress in the theater unit “Sanninkai”, presided by Kappei Yamaguchi, Wataru Takagi, and Tomokazu Seki. On March 31, 2006, she left Fox. Later, she became a member of Gokū, represented by Kappei Yamaguchi.

She made her debut as a voice actress in the 2004 anime film Inuyasha the Movie: Fire on the Mystic Island. After that, she formed the theater unit Tatsumi Musume with Yayoi Otomo, Mai Tanaka, Kazuki Yukimuro and others. In the audition for the role of Kagura Tennōzu in Speed Grapher, the final candidate was rejected.

Since 2008, she refocused on the stage, making sporadic appearances. She sometimes performs voice acting.

Personal life
On June 8, 2010, she announced her marriage and pregnancy. That October she announced that she had successfully given birth.

Filmography

Anime
2006
 Ayakashi: Samurai Horror Tales (Nadeshiko - Tenshu Monogatari)
 Ballad of a Shinigami (Ayame Kozakai)
 D.Gray-man (Terima)
 Futari wa Pretty Cure Splash Star (Saki Hyuuga/Cure Bloom/Cure Bright)

2007
 Da Capo II (Student, 8 episodes)
 Da Capo II: Second Season (Girl, 3 episodes)
 Hitohira (Mugi Asai)
 Majin Tantei Nōgami Neuro (Mei Nishida)
 Nagasarete Airantou (Shinobu)

2008
 Neo Angelique Abyss (Sally)
 Porphy no Nagai Tabi (Machird)

2012
 Area no Kishi (Momoko Fukushima)

Films
 Futari wa Pretty Cure Splash Star: Tick Tack Kiki Ippatsu! (Saki Hyuuga/Cure Bloom/Cure Bright)
 Pretty Cure All Stars DX: Minna Tomodachi Kiseki no Zenin Daishuugou (Saki Hyuuga/Cure Bloom/Cure Bright)
 Pretty Cure All Stars DX2: Kibou no Hikari Rainbow Jewel o Mamore! (Saki Hyuuga/Cure Bloom/Cure Bright)
 Pretty Cure All Stars DX3: Mirai ni Todoke! Sekai o Tsunagu Niji-Iro no Hana! (Saki Hyuuga/Cure Bloom/Cure Bright)
 Pretty Cure All Stars New Stage 3: Eien no Tomodachi (Saki Hyuuga/Cure Bloom/Cure Bright)

Video games 
 Tokyo Afterschool Summoners (Maria, Gabriel, Taromaiti, Kotaro, Babe Bunyan)
 LIVE A HERO (Protagonist, Kirsch)

References

External links
Official agency profile 

1979 births
Living people
Japanese stage actresses
Japanese video game actresses
Japanese voice actresses
Voice actresses from Tokyo